Barbara Stollberg-Rilinger FBA (born 17 July 1955 in Bergisch Gladbach) is a German historian. She mainly researches the early modern period and has held the chair for early modern history at the University of Münster. Stollberg-Rilinger is one of the leading representatives of research that examines the constitutional history of the Holy Roman Empire on the basis of symbolic-ritual forms of communication. Her work on rituals, symbolic communication and ceremonial influenced research on the exercise of power in the pre-modern era.

Career 
She studied German language and literature, history and the history of art at the University of Cologne, graduating in 1980 and earning a doctorate in 1985 in mediaeval and modern history, ancient history and German philology. She habilitated at the University of Cologne in 1994. The first professorship she obtained was at the Historical Institute of the University of Cologne, only to follow a call from the University of Münster, where she has held the chair of Early Modern History since 1997. Since 2018, she has been a rector of the Berlin Institute for Advanced Study.

Her focus lies on the political and cultural movements and changes in Europe in the 17th and 18th century (the Age of Enlightenment).

Political positions – Criticism by the "Jüdische Allgemeine"
In December 2020, Stollberg-Rilinger was one of the initiators of the "Initiative GG 5.3 Open-mindedness" of numerous institutions and persons in the cultural and scientific community. The initiative criticizes a Bundestag resolution of 2019 condemning Boycott, Divestment and Sanctions (BDS) as anti-Semitic and banning government funding for the Israel-hostile movement, and warns against a restriction of the Basic Law constitutionally protected freedom of expression through the "misuse of the accusation of anti-Semitism". The initiators and signatories were accused of ignoring the fact that BDS denied Israel's right to exist.

Awards and honours
 2017 Leipzig Book Fair Prize (non-fiction): "Maria Theresia. Die Kaiserin in ihrer Zeit"
 In July 2017, Stollberg-Rilinger was elected a Corresponding Fellow of the British Academy (FBA), the United Kingdom's national academy for the humanities and social sciences.
 2017 Sigmund Freud Prize for Scientific Prose: "Maria Theresia. Die Kaiserin in ihrer Zeit"
2013 Award of the Historical Collegium of the Bavarian Academy of Sciences and Humanities 
2012 Innovation award of the federal state of North Rhine-Westphalia
2006 Doctorate honoris causa of the Ecole normale superieure Lyon 
2005 Gottfried-Wilhelm-Leibniz Award of DFG

Bibliography 

 
 
 Das Heilige Römische Reich Deutscher Nation. Vom Ende des Mittelalters bis 1806 (= Beck'sche Reihe. C.-H.-Beck-Wissen 2399). 4. durchgesehene Auflage. C. H. Beck, München 2009, .
 
 Des Kaisers alte Kleider. Verfassungsgeschichte und Symbolsprache des Alten Reiches. 2., durchgesehene und aktualisierte Auflage, C. H. Beck, München 2013, .

Critical studies and reviews of Stollberg-Rilinger's work 
"Much ado about nothing?"

References

External links 

Homepage of Barbara Stollberg-Rilinger at the University of Münster
Cluster of Exzellence at the University of Münster
Portrait at the DFG 
Interview at Sciencegarden.de 
Profile at H-Soz-u-Kult 

1955 births
Living people
German women historians
Academic staff of the University of Münster
Gottfried Wilhelm Leibniz Prize winners
Recipients of the Cross of the Order of Merit of the Federal Republic of Germany
Corresponding Fellows of the British Academy
German Historical Institute, Washington, DC
20th-century German historians
21st-century German historians